Frank Bowen may refer to:
 Frank Bowen (rugby league) (1896 – 1964), English rugby league player
 Frank S. Bowen (1905–1976), United States Army general